G2G Racing, also known as Glory 2 God Racing, is an American stock car racing team that currently competes in the NASCAR Craftsman Truck Series, fielding the No. 46 Toyota Tundra full-time for multiple drivers and the No. 47 Toyota Tundra part-time for multiple drivers.

History
The team was first announced in an Instagram post by Viens in May 2021, stating that he had bought trucks from Kyle Busch Motorsports and would be starting his own team in the Truck Series.

Team also acquired all former CMI Motorsports assets from Ray Ciccarelli as well as GMS Racing and Thorsport Racing trucks.

NASCAR Craftsman Truck Series

Truck No. 46 history

On February 10, 2022, it was announced that Matt Jaskol would run full-time in the NASCAR Camping World Truck Series in 2022 driving the No. 46 Toyota Tundra. Jaskol would fail to qualify for the season-opener at Daytona. Brennan Poole would drive the No. 46 truck at Las Vegas with Jaskol instead driving G2G's No. 47 truck, but after Poole made the race and Jaskol did not, G2G decided to have Jaskol drive the No. 46 instead of Poole in that race. Jaskol would finish 22nd at Las Vegas, 19th at Atlanta, and 33rd at COTA in the No. 46 truck. Although Jaskol was originally on the entry list in the No. 46 for the race at Martinsville, it was announced on April 6 (the day before the race) that Kaden Honeycutt would replace Jaskol in the No. 46 and attempt to make his Truck Series debut. On April 7 (the day of the race), Jaskol revealed that he was released from G2G after the team wanted to amend Jaskol and his sponsor AutoParts4Less.com's full season contract and AutoParts4Less.com was "unable to accommodate their request".

In the Bristol Dirt Race, Andrew Gordon would make his return. The truck was a Ford instead of its usual Toyota. Later, NASCAR notified the team that the chassis for their No. 46 truck for the Bristol dirt race was registered to CMI Motorsports (who G2G had purchased the truck from). As a result, Viens had to withdraw the No. 46 truck from the race. Viens then phone called CMI owner Ray Ciccarelli who agreed to file a late entry and field the No. 49 truck for Gordon for the race. In Kansas, Ryan Huff would drive the No. 46 Truck. In Sonoma, Mason Filippi would  attempt to make his Truck Series debuts at Sonoma in the No. 46 truck. Later, Stefan Parsons moved from the No. 47 to replace Filippi in the No. 46 truck in qualifying due to Filippi not adjusting to the truck well enough in practice. Bryson Mitchell drove the No. 46 truck at Knoxville. Chase Janes drove the No. 46 truck at Nashville. Owner Tim Viens drove the No. 46 truck at Talladega. He failed to qualify for the race.

In 2023, Norm Benning would attempt to qualify for the race at Daytona driving the No. 46 truck, replacing Johnny Sauter, who was originally on the entry list for the event.

Truck No. 46 results

Truck No. 47 history
On February 3, 2022, it was announced that the No. 47 would be fielded full-time in 2022 and driven by Johnny Sauter, Tim Viens, and Roger Reuse.

Brennan Poole would drive the truck at Atlanta, setting a good pace with a 9th in the lone practice session but ultimately finishing 28th after having fuel pickup issues and losing all power on the backstretch while running 17th. Samuel LeComte would drive the truck at COTA but would ultimately fail to qualify. Viens was scheduled to make his first start of the season in the No. 47 at Martinsville, but the truck was withdrawn before the race. In Sonoma, Travis McCullough would both attempt to make his Truck Series debuts in the No. 47 truck. However, McCullough had to be replaced due to his drug test results not coming in in time for practice. (As it was his first start of the season, he had to take a drug test beforehand.) Stefan Parsons was going to replace him in the No. 47 truck for qualifying. However, Parsons moved from the No. 47 to replace Filippi in the No. 46 truck in qualifying due to Filippi not adjusting to the truck well enough in practice. The No. 47 truck was withdrawn. Kaden Honeycutt would drive the No. 47 truck at Nashville.

Truck No. 47 results

ARCA Menards Series
On December 25, 2021, Tim Viens announced that he had bought an ARCA car from the closed Chad Bryant Racing team, hinting that G2G could field an ARCA Menards Series team in 2022 as well. However, the team has yet to announce any ARCA plans.

As of June 10th, 2022, The car has been listed for sale by Viens.

References

External links
 Official website
 

American auto racing teams
NASCAR teams
Auto racing teams established in 2021